Helvella phlebophora is a species of fungi in the family Helvellaceae of the order Pezizales.

Distribution
This species has been found in China

References

External links
Index Fungorum

phlebophora
Fungi of Asia
Fungi of Europe